Highway 303 is a highway in the Canadian province of Saskatchewan.

Major intersections
From west to east:

Footnotes

References

303